Gabriele Zerbi (1445–1505) was a Veronese professor at the Universities of Bologna and Padua. He was also referred to as Zerbus, Zerbo, Zerbis, Gerbo, Gerbi, and Gerbus. He survived the devastating bubonic plague outbreak of 1477–79 in Northern Italy. He published the first printed treatise on geriatrics, "Gerontocomia: On the Care of the Aged," which took the form of a practical guide. His other works included: Questiones Metaphysicae; De Cautelis Medicorum; Liber anatomiae corporis humani et singulorum membrorum illius; De anatomia infantiis et porci ex traditione Cophonis, and Libellus de preservatione corporum a passione calculosa.

Early life 
Gabriele Zerbi was born in Verona to Francesco and Paola. Not much is known about his mother, Paola, but in various community documents that mention his father, Francesco, it appears that he was involved in various duties of civic responsibility, including the financial affairs of Verona. He had two brothers named Benedetto and Giovanni as well as two sisters named Taddea and Angela, the former also being the name given to Zerbi's daughter.

Academic career 
While it is unclear exactly where Zerbi obtained his university degree, he spent notable amount of his youth in Venice, leading to the belief that he studied at the University of Padua. It is also here that he began a four-year teaching post in philosophy starting in 1467 at the age of twenty-two. Zerbi also taught medicine and logic at the University of Bologna from 1475 to 1483. Between 1483 and 1494, Zerbi lived in Rome, but not much is known about his academic career during this time period. After living in Rome, he returned to the University of Padua to be a lecturer "de sero" between 1494 and 1505. In the summer of 1499 Zerbi went to Venice and practiced as a physician; he avoided paying taxes other physicians had to pay by only practicing there during the school break. In May 1503 Lorenzino de Medici became ill and sent for a physician from Florence to come and treat him; Zerbi was chosen over Hieronimo da Verona and given leave of absence from his teaching position.

Death 
Zerbi's death came about after treating his last patient.  He was summoned by Skander, chief minister of the sultan of the Ottoman Turks. Zerbi had fled from the wrath of Pope Sixtus, and Skander was ill with a severe case of dysentery.  The doctor brought along his young son on his visit to the Turks.  After curing the prince, Zerbi received a large sum of gold, jewels, and other valuable items as payment.  On his way home, however, the prince fell ill again and died due to not following Zerbi's instructions.  His sons, thinking Zerbi had poisoned their father, pursued and captured Zerbi to punish him.  They sawed Zerbi's son in half before him, then immediately sawed Zerbi in half as well. According to his will last dated on October 13, 1504, his wife Helena de' Metaselimi of Bologna and the godfather of his children Pietro of Mantua were the executors of his estate. After her, his estate would go to his four sons: Paolo, Hieronymo or Girolamo, Marco, and Giovanni Aloisio. In addition, he gave money to his daughters, Taddea and Hermodoria, his sisters, Clara and Angela, his brothers, Giovanni and Benedetto, and to his nephew, Francesco.

Works 
 His first work, Questiones Metaphysicae, was a commentary on Aristotle's own Metaphysics.
Gerontocomia discussed the coping and treating of elderly. It discussed topics such as diet, optimal living situations, beneficial medicines, and how to ensure the physical well-being of the elderly.
De Cautelis Medicorum was a text discussing the medical ethics that a practicing physician should follow. The text included what a physician's appearance should resemble, hygienic habits, and preferred spiritual beliefs.
Liber Anathomie Corporis Humani
De Generatione Embrionis was Zerbi's last published essay; it covered most of Zerbi's work on pregnant animals.

Zerbi was a strong advocate for the code of physicians. This code includes six categories of rules all physicians should abide by.
Rules for the course of studies and the perfection of the physician, according to the congenital dispositions of the soul and body.
The obligations of the physician toward God.
Recommendations for acquired dispositions and general conduct.
The proper attitude toward the patient.
Rules for the attitude toward the patient's family and other people involved with the cure.
Regulation of the physician's relationship with the general public.

Zerbi gained much of his knowledge of human anatomy by dissecting various animals since human cadavers were scarce. By doing this, he opened up the first discipline of comparative anatomy.

He also was one of the first physicians to separate the organs into systems and focused his attention on the kidneys. He discovered veins do not enter inside the kidneys, but only reach their periphery. Zerbi hypothesized the kidneys act as a filter to filter liquid before it enters the bladder but other physicians doubted this.

References 

1445 births
1505 deaths
15th-century Italian physicians
Executed Italian people
Physicians from Verona
15th-century Italian writers
Academic staff of the University of Bologna